L'Autre is a 2020 French drama film written and directed by Charlotte Dauphin. It stars Àstrid Bergès-Frisbey, Anouk Grinberg, James Thierrée, Jean-Louis Martinelli, and Charlotte Dauphin. It had its premiere in France on January 8, 2020.

Plot
Marie is a young dancer from the Paris Opera. After the brutal death of her father on the day of her thirtieth birthday, she decides to stop her artistic practice and pursue an increasingly lonely existence. Marie’s mourning locks her in her memories, through mysterious writings left by her father, her own thoughts, and a house that seems to imprison her. Her love for Paul, a photographer who took the last portrait of her father a few minutes before his death, helps to gradually awaken in Marie a life force that helps her become another version of herself.

Cast
 Àstrid Bergès-Frisbey as Marie
 Anouk Grinberg as Marie
 James Thierrée as Paul
 Jean-Louis Martinelli as the father
 Charlotte Dauphin as the mother

Release 
The film premiered in North American premiere at the San Diego International Film Festival in October 2020.

Awards and nominations

|-
! scope="row" | 2020
| Taormina Film Fest
| Best Actress
| Àstrid Bergès-Frisbey
| 
|

References

External links
 
 L'Autre on Rotten Tomatoes

2020 films
2020 drama films
2020s French-language films
French drama films
2020s French films